Wacław z Szamotuł (Szamotuły, near Poznań, c. 1520 – c. 1560, Pińczów), also called Wacław Szamotulski and (in Latin) Venceslaus Samotulinus, was a Polish composer.

Life
Wacław z Szamotuł was a student at the Lubrański Academy in Poznań later studying at Kraków University in 1538. In 1547 or 1548 he was appointed composer to the court of Sigismund II Augustus. In 1555 Wacław left Kraków, having received the title of "royal composer." Nevertheless, during Szamotuly's lifetime his music was known outside of Poland.

He died early, and only a few of his works survive. In the words of Szymon Starowolski, who wrote the first concise biography of Wacław, "If the gods had let him live longer, the Poles would have no need to envy the Italians their Palestrina, Lappi or Vedana."

His motets In te Domine speravi and Ego sum pastor bonus were the first Polish musical compositions to be published abroad.  According to Gustave Reese, Wacław's style may be seen in both of these motets; "the constant overlapping of phrases and full-fledged imitative style reveal Franco-Netherlandish influence."

Works 
Motets (Motety)
 In te, Domine, speravi (published in Nuremberg, 1554)
 Ego sum pastor bonus (published in Nuremberg, 1564)
 Nunc scio vere

Songs (Pieśńi)
 Alleluja, Chwalcie Pana Alleluia (Laudate Dominum omnes gentes — Hallelujah, Praise the Lord)
 Nakłoń, Panie, ku mnie ucho Twoje (Turn Thy Ear to Me, O Lord)
 Kryste dniu naszej światłości (O Christ, Day of Our Light) — a Lenten compline hymn (c. 800)
 Błogosławiony człowiek (Beatus vir, qui non abiit... — Blessed Is the Man)
 Modlitwa, gdy dziatki spać idą or Już się zmierzka (A Prayer When the Children Go To Sleep). This is perhaps his best-known composition. Henryk Górecki (born 1933) has used this beautiful Renaissance melody in at least three compositions: Chorale in the Form of a Canon (1961/1984), Old Polish Music (1969), and the First String Quartet (1988), subtitled Już się zmierzcha (Dusk is Approaching).
 Pieśń o narodzeniu Pańskim or Pochwalmyż wszytcy społem (Song of the Nativity)
 Powszechna spowiedź (Daily Confession). This composition has a homophonic texture, meaning that essentially all the notes occur at the same time, as contrasted with imitative polyphony.

See also
List of Poles

Citations

References

External links
 Scores by Wacław of Szamotuły in National Digital Library of Poland (Polona)

1520s births
1560s deaths
People from Szamotuły
Polish Calvinist and Reformed Christians
Renaissance composers
Polish composers
Jagiellonian University alumni
Polish male classical composers